Plavi FM or Plavi Radio Banja Luka is a Bosnian local commercial radio station, broadcasting from Banja Luka, Bosnia and Herzegovina. This radio station broadcasts a variety of programs such as music and local news. The owner of the radio station is the company BL PLAVI 2013 d.o.o. Banja Luka.

The program is mainly produced in Serbian at one FM frequency (Banja Luka ) and it is available in the city of Banja Luka as well as in nearby municipalities Laktaši, Čelinac, Prnjavor, Bosanska Gradiška/Gradiška and Kotor Varoš.

Estimated number of listeners of Plavi FM is around 248.678.

Frequencies
 Banja Luka

See also 
 List of radio stations in Bosnia and Herzegovina
 Big Radio 1
 Radio A
 Pop FM
 Hard Rock Radio
 RSG Radio

References

External links 
 www.plaviradio.net
 www.radiostanica.ba
 www.fmscan.org
 Communications Regulatory Agency of Bosnia and Herzegovina

Banja Luka
Radio stations established in 2014
Mass media in Banja Luka